Little Steeping was a railway station on the East Lincolnshire Railway which served the hamlet of Little Steeping in Lincolnshire between 1848 and 1964. Withdrawal of passenger services took place in 1961, followed by goods facilities in 1964. The line through the station remains in use as the Poacher Line, although the Kirkstead and Little Steeping Railway closed throughout on 5 October 1970.

History

The station was opened on 2 October 1848 to serve the hamlet of Little Steeping. This section was the last to be completed in September 1848 at an agreed cost of  £123,000. The station was provided with two platforms: a signal box was built on the up platform and the main station buildings were on the down platform. The signal box was situated near the level crossing over a minor road linking Little Steeping with Great Steeping to the north.

This added to the five up and four down services and one Sunday service each way on the East Lincolnshire Line. A new 25-lever Saxby & Farmer signal box was opened at Bellwater Junction to the south of Little Steeping station where what became known as the "New Line" joined the East Lincolnshire Line; this replaced a four-lever ground frame next to what had been an occupation crossing with a crossing keeper's cottage. The station was closed to passengers on 11 September 1961 and to goods traffic on 15 June 1964. The last day of operation of the New Line was Saturday 3 October 1970.

Present day

References

Sources

 

 

Disused railway stations in Lincolnshire
Railway stations in Great Britain closed in 1961
Railway stations in Great Britain opened in 1848
Former Great Northern Railway stations